Drosia (meaning "dew", before 1947: Ρωσσοχώρι - Rossochori) is a suburb in Athens, Attica, Greece. Since the 2011 local government reform it is part of the municipality Dionysos, of which it is a municipal unit.

Drosia is a mainly residential suburb, known for its location in the midst of evergreen pine forests.  During the extreme heat of Greek summers, many people from whole Athens drive up to Drosia on the weekends, seeking cool and shade in the taverns, cafes and one outdoor cinema theater, for which the area is known.

Geography

Drosia is situated in the hills in the northeastern part of the Athens conurbation, at about 370 m elevation. The municipal unit has an area of 2.201 km2. It lies at the northwestern foot of the Penteliko Mountain. It is 1 km southwest of Stamata, 3 km northeast of Ekali, 3 km south of Agios Stefanos and 19 km northeast of Athens city centre. Its built-up area is continuous with those of the neighbouring suburbs Stamata, Rodopoli, Dionysos and Ekali. Greek National Road 83 (Athens - Marathon - Rafina) passes through Drosia.

History

A former rural village, Drosia started growing with the arrival of refugees from Pontus after the Greco-Turkish War of 1919-1922. Originally named Rossochori, it was renamed to Drosia in 1947. It was part of the community of Stamata until 1950, when it became a separate community.

Historical population

See also
List of municipalities of Attica

References

External links
Official website 

Populated places in East Attica
Dionysos, Greece